This is a list of colleges and universities in Washington state, including other educational institutions providing higher education.

State institutions

Four-year institutions

Two-year institutions
Bates Technical College, Tacoma
Bellevue College, Bellevue
Bellingham Technical College, Bellingham
Big Bend Community College, Moses Lake
Cascadia College, Bothell
Centralia College, Centralia
Clark College, Vancouver
Clover Park Technical College, Lakewood
Columbia Basin College
 Pasco
 Richland
Community Colleges of Spokane
Spokane Community College, Spokane
Spokane Falls Community College, Spokane
Edmonds College, Lynnwood
Everett Community College, Everett
Grays Harbor College, Aberdeen
Green River College
Auburn
Enumclaw
Kent
Highline College
Des Moines
Federal Way
Lake Washington Institute of Technology
Kirkland
Redmond
Lower Columbia College, Longview
Olympic College
Bremerton
Poulsbo
Shelton
Peninsula College
 Port Angeles
 Port Townsend
 Forks
Pierce College
Pierce College Fort Steilacoom, Lakewood
Pierce College Puyallup, Puyallup
Renton Technical College, Renton
Seattle Colleges District (formerly Seattle Community Colleges)
North Seattle College, Seattle
Seattle Central College, Seattle
Seattle Vocational Institute, Seattle
South Seattle College, Seattle
Shoreline Community College, Shoreline
Skagit Valley College, Mount Vernon
South Puget Sound Community College
 Olympia
 Lacey
Tacoma Community College, Tacoma
Walla Walla Community College, Walla Walla
Wenatchee Valley College
 Wenatchee
 Omak
Whatcom Community College, Bellingham
 Yakima Valley College
 Yakima
 Grandview

Primarily two-year institutions that also grant four-year degrees
Bellevue College, Bellevue
Bellingham Technical College, Bellingham
Big Bend Community College, Moses Lake 
Centralia College, Centralia
Clark College, Vancouver
Columbia Basin College, Pasco
Green River College, Auburn
Edmonds College, Lynnwood
Highline College, Des Moines
Lake Washington Institute of Technology, Kirkland
Lower Columbia College, Longview 
Moody Aviation, Spokane
North Seattle College, Seattle
Olympic College, Bremerton
Pierce College, Lakewood
Seattle Central College, Seattle
Skagit Valley College, Mount Vernon
South Seattle College, Seattle
Spokane Falls Community College, Spokane
Tacoma Community College, Tacoma
Whatcom Community College, Bellingham
Yakima Valley Community College, Yakima

Tribal institutions
Northwest Indian College, Bellingham, Washington

Private institutions

Four-year institutions

Two-year institutions
School of Visual Concepts, Seattle

Private colleges and universities
Columbia College, Marysville
DigiPen Institute of Technology, Redmond
Faith Evangelical Lutheran Seminary, Tacoma
Heritage University, Toppenish
Northeastern University, Seattle Campus, Seattle
Northwest University, Kirkland
Pacific Northwest University of Health Sciences, Yakima
St. Martin's University, Lacey
Seattle Bible College, Seattle
Seattle Pacific University, Seattle
Seattle University, Seattle
Matteo Ricci College, Seattle
Washington Technology University, Bellevue
Whitman College, Walla Walla
Whitworth University, Spokane

Defunct private colleges and universities 
Adelphia College, Seattle
Argosy University/Seattle, Seattle 
The Art Institute of Seattle, Seattle
DeVry University
Bellevue (location closed)
Federal Way (location closed)
Griffin College, Seattle
Northwest Theological Seminary, Lynnwood
Pinchot University, Seattle
Henry Cogswell College, Everett
Interface College, Spokane
Moody Bible Institute Spokane
Trinity Lutheran College, Seattle

See also
 Higher education in the United States
 List of college athletic programs in Washington (state)
 List of American institutions of higher education
 List of recognized higher education accreditation organizations
List of colleges and universities
List of colleges and universities by country

References

External links
Department of Education listing of accredited institutions in Washington

 
Washington
Colleges and universities